A list of University of Surrey academics, includes those who work or have worked at the University of Surrey, including a brief description of their notability.

Science and engineering
 Alf Adams – physicist who pioneered the strained quantum-well laser
 Jim Al-Khalili – nuclear physicist, author and broadcaster
 Lewis Elton – physicist and researcher into higher education
 Sir Martin Sweeting – founder of Surrey Satellite Technology Ltd
 Allan Wells – Olympic 100m gold medalist; engineering lecturer
 Henryk Zygalski – mathematician, cryptologist and breaker of the Enigma Machine

Humanities and social science
 Sara Arber – sociologist
 Martyn Barrett – psychologist and lead expert for the Council of Europe's Education Policy Advisers Network
 David Blanchflower – economist and member of the Monetary Policy Committee
 Dame Glynis Breakwell – psychologist
 Marie Breen Smyth – international relations scholar
 Greville G Corbett - distinguished professor of linguistics
 Nigel Gilbert – sociologist, pioneer in the use of agent-based models in the social sciences	
 Tim Jackson – ecological economist; professor of sustainable development; author of Prosperity Without Growth
 Diane Watt—medievalist.
 Roberta Guerrina – political scientist

Health and Medical Sciences 
 Derk-Jan Dijk - Distinguished Professor of Sleep and Physiology, Director of Surrey Sleep Research Centre
 Jill Maben - Nurse academic and educator

See also
 List of University of Surrey alumni

References

 
Surrey